Paul Graham Taylor is Professor Emeritus of International Relations at the London School of Economics and Political Science. His main areas of expertise are European integration and international organisations. From 2001 to 2004 he was Director of the European Institute at the same institution.

Publications
Taylor, P. (2010). The careless state: Wealth and welfare in Britain today. Bloomsbury.
Taylor, P. (2008). The end of European integration: Anti-Europeanism examined. Routledge.
Taylor, P. (2005). International organization in the age of globalization. Continuum.
Taylor, P. (1996). The European Union in the 1990s. Oxford University Press.
Taylor, P. (1993). Taylor, Paul (1993) International organization in the modern world: the regional and the global pattern. Pinter.
Taylor, P. (1983). The limits of European integration. Croom Helm.

References

European Union and European integration scholars
Academics of the London School of Economics
Living people
Year of birth missing (living people)